Eight ships of the Royal Navy have been named HMS Teazer :

 Teazer was a gunboat purchased in the West Indies that participated in the capture of Martinique, St Lucia, and Guadeloupe in 1794
  was a 14-gun gunvessel launched in 1794 and sold in 1802.
  was a 6-gun schooner purchased in 1798 for local use off Honduras. Her fate is unknown.
  was a 12-gun gun-brig launched in 1804; the French captured her in 1805, but the British recaptured her in 1811 and sold her in 1815.
  was a  launched in 1846 and broken up in 1862.
  was a  composite gunboat launched in 1868 and broken up in 1887.
  was a  launched in 1895 and sold in 1912.
  was an  launched in 1917 and sold in 1931.
  was a T-class destroyer launched in 1943. She was converted to a Type 16 frigate between 1953 and 1955, and was broken up in 1965.

References
 
 Gossett, William Patrick (1986) The lost ships of the Royal Navy, 1793-1900. (London: Mansell). 
 

Royal Navy ship names